Republic Tobacco LP is a multinational wholesaler, distributor, and retailer of tobacco, based in the Chicago suburb of Glenview, Illinois, United States.

Republic Tobacco is wholly owned by Republic Group (Republic Technologies LLC is the parent company), which includes the manufacturer affiliates of Top Tobacco, Republic Technologies: JOB and Odet-Cascadec-Bolloré (OCB) cigarette papers, Altesse GmbH (filter tubes), H.T.H. Tabak (cigarettes, snuff, and tobacco), and Productos Technologicos Catalanes (smoking accessories), as well as Republic Tobacco, representing a combined sales and distribution presence in more than 90 countries .

The company was founded by Donald Levin. Levin began with a small smoke shop called Adams Apple (which no longer exists). He then went into wholesale distribution and grew his company into the largest roll-your-own tobacco company in the world.

In 1969, Levin became the U.S. distributor for JOB rolling papers.  He built the brand and used the profits to purchase the TOP Tobacco Factory & Brands from R. J. Reynolds in the early 1980s. He is rumored to have a copy of the check he wrote to RJR on his wall to this day.

Over the years, Levin oversaw his company's expansion, which eventually culminated in 2000 his purchase of some of the Bolloré brands like French brands OCB and JOB. In July 2009, he also bought from Bolloré Papeteries du Léman and Papeteries des Vosges, two French paper mills specialized in thin papers .

He also purchased the Chicago Wolves sports team; produced many movies, including Maximum Overdrive.

See also
 List of rolling papers

External links

Company profile

Tobacco companies of the United States
Cigarette rolling papers
Companies based in Glenview, Illinois